Ben Fayot (born 25 June 1937 in Luxembourg City) is a Luxembourgish politician from the Luxembourg Socialist Workers' Party (LSAP). Fayot sat in the Chamber of Deputies for five years from 1984. He was a Member of the European Parliament from 1989 until 1999, when he returned to the Chamber of Deputies. Since 2004, he has been the president of the LSAP's deputation in the Chamber of Deputies.

By profession, Fayot was a political historian, specialising in the history of socialism in Luxembourg. He is also a contributor to the daily Tageblatt newspaper on the topics related to socialism.

References

Members of the Chamber of Deputies (Luxembourg)
Members of the Chamber of Deputies (Luxembourg) from Centre
Councillors in Luxembourg City
Luxembourg Socialist Workers' Party politicians
20th-century Luxembourgian historians
Luxembourgian journalists
Male journalists
Alumni of the Athénée de Luxembourg
Tageblatt people
1937 births
Living people
People from Luxembourg City
Luxembourg Socialist Workers' Party MEPs
MEPs for Luxembourg 1989–1994
MEPs for Luxembourg 1994–1999